Mulan is a township of Huangpi District in northeastern Hubei province, China.

References

Geography of Wuhan
Township-level divisions of Hubei